The men's 4 × 400 metres relay event at the 2008 Summer Olympics took place on 22 and 23 August at the Beijing National Stadium.

There were 16 NOCs competing at this event. These 16 NOCs were selected by the average of the two best marks at the qualifying period. The final was won by the United States in the new Olympic record time 2:55.39.

Summary
Having swept the 400 metres and winning the World Championships as part of their qualifying process, defending champion USA came in as an overwhelming favorite.

USA put their Olympic champion LaShawn Merritt on the leadoff leg with the intent to break the race wide open from the start.  The strategy worked, Merritt ran 44.01 out of the blocks.  400 hurdles champion Angel Taylor hit the break line with an 8 metre lead over Belgium, who also front loaded their order with brothers Kévin Borlée and Jonathan Borlée.  Jonathan closed down on Taylor down the backstretch, with Bahamas Michael Mathieu working his way through traffic to move into third.  Down the home stretch, Taylor re-opened the lead to 8 metres before handing off to bronze medalist David Neville.  A 45 second runner, Belgium's Cédric Van Branteghem was no match as Neville pulled away while Bahamas Andrae Williams closed in from behind.  USA handed off to their silver medalist Jeremy Wariner, who was also the defending 400 champion coming into these Olympics.  Belgium's 47 second anchor Arnaud Ghislain was caught by Bahamas 4th place, 44 second anchor Chris Brown halfway through the turn.  Wariner continued to open the gap all the way to a 25 metre victory.  Brown was in the sights of Russia's Denis Alekseyev through the final turn until he opened up a clear second place down the home stretch.  Taking the baton in 6th place, GBR's 400 metre finalist Martyn Rooney worked his way past Jamaica and Belgium, almost catching Alekseyev at the line.

Eight years later, Alekseyev was found guilty of doping.  He and the Russian team were disqualified giving GBR the bronze medal.

Records
Prior to this competition, the existing world and Olympic records were as follows.

The following Olympic record was set during this competition.

Qualification summary

Results
All times shown are in seconds.
Q denotes automatic qualification.
q denotes fastest losers.
DNS denotes did not start.
DNF denotes did not finish.
DQ denotes disqualified
AR denotes area record.
NR denotes national record.
PB denotes personal best.
SB denotes season's best.

Round 1
First 3 in each heat(Q) and the next 2 fastest(q) advance to the Final.

Final

* On 14 September 2016, IOC officially stripped Russia of the bronze medal for positive doping test of Denis Alekseyev. Reallocation to Great Britain was confirmed on 21 June 2017.

References

 Results on website IAAF

Athletics at the 2008 Summer Olympics
Relay foot races at the Olympics
Olympics 2008
Men's events at the 2008 Summer Olympics